Orders of chivalry for women, orders of knighthood for women or ladies orders are orders of chivalry reserved solely for women.  These knighthoods for women made their first appearance in 1600, and have been less numerous than traditional knighthoods reserved for men. 

Though many kingdoms, such as Great Britain or the Netherlands, allow both men and women to be invested with the same orders of knighthood, orders in other kingdoms were exclusive for men.  Several of these kingdoms eventually established orders for the exclusive membership of women.  Tradition frequently called upon the reigning queen or empress, queen or empress consort to serve as the Grand Mistress of their respective all-female, royal or imperial orders.  In other cases, the king or emperor is the sole male member of the order, acting in his role as the sovereign or master of all orders established and conferred within his kingdom or empire.  A high number of female orders existed in Germany, Austria and Russia.

List of Ladies' orders
The following list of orders that were established for the sole or primary membership of women:

Austria
Order of Elizabeth
Order of the Starry Cross

Egypt
Order of the Virtues (Egypt)

France
Order of the Ladies of the Cord

Germany
Bavaria
Order of Theresa
Order of Saint Elizabeth
Prussia
Order of Louise
Ladies Merit Cross

Saxony
Order of Sidonia

Württemberg
Order of Olga

Greece
Order of Beneficence
Order of Saints Olga and Sophia

Japan
Order of the Precious Crown

Korean Empire

Ottoman Empire
 Order of Charity

Persia
Order of Aftab
Order of the Pleiades

Portugal
Order of Saint Isabel

Philippines
Order of Gabriela Silang

Russia
Order of Saint Catherine

Spain
Order of Queen Maria Luisa

United Kingdom
Order of the Crown of India

References